"Perplexing Pegasus" is a song by American hip hop duo Rae Sremmurd, released on August 4, 2017. It is the lead single from their third studio album SR3MM (2018). Mike Will Made It, J-Bo and Kent Luciiano produced the song.

Background
The song was previewed on Twitter by Mike Will Made It in June 2017. In July 2017, Rae Sremmurd announced the song in an interview with Tim Westwood and later its release date. The cover art of the single was drawn by Swae Lee.

Rapper 2 Chainz originally had a verse on the song, but it was removed by Mike Will Made It.

Composition
The song has a trap production featuring "bass-heavy drum pattern, augmented with glitchy cymbals and hi-hats". In it, Rae Sremmurd sing about their lifestyles of luxurious spending and "money, clothes and women". "Pegasus" refers to an expensive foreign car.

Music video
The music video was released on November 17, 2017. It finds Slim Jxmmi and Swae Lee partying in different rooms, surrounded by "weed smoke" and women, blending "'70s style afros with the gaudier looks of the late '90s".

Charts

Certifications

References

2017 singles
2017 songs
Rae Sremmurd songs
Songs written by Swae Lee
Songs written by Mike Will Made It
Songs written by Slim Jxmmi
Song recordings produced by Mike Will Made It
Interscope Records singles